Wun-Chang Shih (born October 3, 1986) is a Taiwanese figure skater who competes internationally for Taiwan in men's singles. He is a two-time Taiwanese national medalist and competed four times at the Four Continents Championships.

Personal life 
Shih was born on October 3, 1986, in Taipei, Taiwan. He is currently a student and trains with coach Nobuo Sato. His hobbies include basketball and badminton.

Skating career 
Shih made his international debut at the 2009 Four Continents Figure Skating Championships, in Vancouver, Canada. He was a member of the Chinese Taipei team at the 2009 Winter Universiade in Harbin, China and the 2011 Asian Winter Games in Nur-Sultan, Kazakhstan.

Competitive highlights

Programs

References

External links 

 

Taiwanese male single skaters
Living people
1986 births
Sportspeople from Taipei
Competitors at the 2009 Winter Universiade